The name Octave has been used for five tropical cyclones in the Eastern Pacific Ocean.
 Tropical Storm Octave (1983)
 Hurricane Octave (1989)
 Hurricane Octave (2001)
 Tropical Storm Octave (2013)
 Tropical Storm Octave (2019)

Pacific hurricane set index articles